The 1957 All-Ireland Junior Hurling Championship was the 36th staging of the All-Ireland Junior Championship since its establishment by the Gaelic Athletic Association in 1912.

Kilkenny entered the championship as the defending champions, however, they were beaten in the Leinster Championship.

The All-Ireland final was played on 6 October 1957 at the Gaelic Grounds in Limerick, between Limerick and London, in what was their first meeting in a final in three years. Limerick won the match by 5-12 to 2-05 to claim their fourth championship title overall and a first title since 1954.

Results

All-Ireland Junior Hurling Championship

All-Ireland semi-finals

All-Ireland home final

All-Ireland final

References

Junior
All-Ireland Junior Hurling Championship